The Magician's Elephant is a musical with book and lyrics by Nancy Harris and music and lyrics by Marc Teitler, based on the 2009 children's novel of the same name by Kate DiCamillo.

Production history

Stratford-upon-Avon (2021) 
The musical was announced to make its world premiere as part of the Royal Shakespeare Company's winter 2020 season, running in the Royal Shakespeare Theatre in Stratford-upon-Avon. However, due to the ongoing COVID-19 pandemic, the production was postponed to run over the 2021 winter season running from 18 October 2021 to 1 January 2022.

The production is directed by Sarah Tipple, designed by Colin Richmond with lighting design by Oliver Fenwick.

On 9 July 2021, initial casting was announced and a recording of a song from the show "If This Is True" was released on YouTube, followed by another song "A Lot Like Me" released on 26 July 2021.

Cast and characters

Reception 
The Stratford-upon-Avon production received positive reviews from the critics and audiences receiving mostly four star reviews.

References 

Musicals based on novels
British musicals
2021 musicals